Kim Jong-kook (born April 25, 1976) is a South Korean singer, entertainer, and actor. Kim debuted as a member of South Korean duo Turbo in 1995. The duo was considered to be one of the most popular idols in that time and sold out millions of albums in South Korea and Asia. Following the disbanding of the duo in 2000, Kim released his debut solo album, Renaissance, in December 2001.

As a solo artist, Kim has received several awards, including three Golden Disk Awards, two Seoul Music Awards, two KBS Music Awards, two SBS Music Awards, two MBC Music Awards, one MBC Best 10 Music Award, one Mnet Asian Music Award, and one Melon Music Award.

Apart from his music career, Kim established himself as an entertainer, notably through his participation in variety shows including X-man, Family Outing and gained worldwide popularity following his participation in Running Man.

Biography
Kim was born on April 25, 1976, in Yongsan, South Korea. His family consists of his parents and an older brother, who is a doctor. Kim attended Myeong Hak Elementary School, Shin Seong Middle High School and graduated from Hansei University in BA (music composition). He then obtained a master's degree from the Pop Culture Performing Arts – School of Arts Department of Dankook University.

Career

1995–2000: Turbo
Kim Jong-kook first entered the Korean music industry in 1995 as a member of the duo, Turbo, which became immensely popular for their catchy music. After the duo disbanded a few years later, he became a solo singer in 2001, mostly concentrating on ballads.

2001–2005: Solo career and music daesang
Kim Jong-kook had a setback after Turbo as he faced difficulties settling down as a solo artist. Problems like lack of songs from composers, less support from his respected agency, and also a change of taste within the fans caused his first album as a solo artist to fail. However, he made a successful comeback with his second album Evolution in 2004, which spawned the hit single "One Man". Kim then became a permanent cast member of the popular variety game show, X-Man, which further raised his popularity.

In 2005, Kim released his third album, This Is Me. The album sold over 300,000 copies and became one of the best-selling albums in Korea that year. The lead single, "Lovable" topped various music charts, and was included in online games such as Pump It Up and Audition Online. Kim swept the Daesang (Artist of the Year) Award from all three major Korean TV stations, SBS, KBS, and MBC, becoming the second artist to accomplish this feat since Cho Yong-pil in the 1980s.

2006–2014: Variety show, music releases, military service and rising popularity
Kim was made the leader of the first series of Shootdori, where kids who are interested in soccer form teams and compete. However, he had to leave the team after receiving an enlistment notice. He wrote and sang a song for his team, titled "Toward a Dream". Kim enlisted in March 2006. Around that time, he released his 4th album, Volume 4 - Kim Jong-kook's Fourth Letter. The music video of the lead single, Saying I Love You, featured Yoon Eun-hye, who was previously involved in a love-line with him in X-Man. Though Kim was unable to directly promote the album as he was in the military, the album sold more than 100,000 copies and later won "Album of the Year" at the Melon Music Awards.

It was announced in late April 2008 that the singer would end his military service on May 23, 2008. On that day, he was greeted by fans, and during an interview, he said that he was "relieved". His fifth studio album, Here I Am, was released on October 22, 2008, with songs such as "Today More than Yesterday" and "Thank You".

Kim also returned to television, becoming a permanent member of reality-variety show Family Outing since episode 19, part of SBS's Good Sunday lineup. Family Outing has become one of the top-rated shows in Korea, consistently achieving the highest ratings for the Sunday mid-afternoon time-slot, and has gained online popularity among Hallyu fans.

His sixth album, titled The Eleventh Story was released on January 27, 2010. The album featured the singles "This is the Person" and "Don't Be Good to Me". The music video of the latter single featured fellow Family Outing cast member Park Ye-jin.

In 2010, Kim became a cast member of SBS' variety show Running Man. In 2011, he won the "Best TV Star Award" at the SBS Entertainment Awards. Kim gained pan-Asia popularity from the show, becoming one of the most searched Korean stars in Singapore, and having his showcase there sold out with more than 1,700 fans in attendance. He also enjoyed success in China, where he consistently topped polls such as being voted #1 Korean singer on the Chinese streaming website, Tudou, and being ranked second most popular Korean male celebrity on Baidu.

On November 1, 2012, following a pre-release of selected songs from his new album, Kim made a comeback to the music scene with the release of his seventh studio album, Journey Home, after three years. His fellow Running Man co-stars Haha and Gary participated in the album as well as former Running Man member Song Joong-ki, who starred in the music video for lead single "Men Are All Like That". The same year, he began to host the documentary program Crisis Escape No. 1, which won him the "Best Entertainer Award" at the 2013 KBS Entertainment Awards.

In 2014, he formed a duo with fellow Running Man cast member Haha, known as Running Man Brothers. The musical duo held a concert tour in the United States in July and December.

2015–present: Acting debut, chinese debut, Turbo reunion and entertainment daesang 
In 2015, Kim made his official acting debut with a supporting role in the KBS drama, The Producers, and was praised for his "solid acting chops".

In September 2015, he left Urban Works ENT after his contract expired. He later went on to sign an exclusive contract with Maroo Entertainment in October 2015.

In December 2015, he and fellow Turbo members Kim Jung-nam and Mikey reunited for Turbo's 20th anniversary album. The album titled Again was released on December 21, 2015. The eponymous lead single, 다시 (Again), which features Yoo Jae-suk, topped online music charts upon its release.

On August 23, 2016, he officially made his singing debut in China with his first single, "Hate That Happiness Came" (恨幸福来过), produced by JJ Lin and lyrics written by Vincent Fang.

On December 19, 2020, Kim made history by becoming the first male celebrity, and 2nd person ever to win a Daesang in both Music and Entertainment. He received the Grand Prize Award (Daesang) at the 14th SBS Entertainment Awards for his participation in Running Man and My Little Old Boy.

On June 17 , 2021, Kim launches fitness-focused YouTube channel "GYM JONG KOOK" with just under 100,000 subscribers registered in the first five minutes.

Personal life
Kim Jong-kook is able to speak English in addition to his native Korean.

Kim is the uncle of singer Soya. Kim is known to be good friends with Jang Hyuk, Cha Tae-hyun, Hong Kyung-min and Hong Kyung-in. The five are known as the "Dragon Brothers" because they were all born in 1976, the year of the dragon.

On August 27, 2010, Kim received a lumbar microdiscectomy surgery to relieve a herniated disk. Kim's management company, 101 Entertainment stated, “Kim Jong-kook carried on with his daily activities without knowing that he had a ruptured disk. However, he did feel pain, but did not think much of it, and he endured his condition with painkillers while filming SBS Running Man."

In January 2015, he was a guest on the popular talk show, Healing Camp, where he shed light on many personal controversies, including his choice to work as a public service worker instead of an active-duty soldier during his mandatory military enlistment, which was partly due to the aforementioned back issues.

In December 2019, his hernia surgery was documented on My Little Old Boy.

Discography

Studio albums

Singles

Soundtrack appearances

Filmography

Film

Television series

Television shows

Web shows

Hosting

Awards and nominations

Notes

References

External links

 Kim Jong-kook's Official Website 

1976 births
South Korean Buddhists
Living people
K-pop singers
South Korean rhythm and blues singers
South Korean dance musicians
South Korean television personalities
South Korean male television actors
People from Anyang, Gyeonggi
Dankook University alumni
MAMA Award winners
21st-century South Korean male singers
The Amazing Race contestants